Vinayak Tukaram Mete (30 June 1970 – 14 August 2022) was an Indian politician from Rajegaon in Beed, Maharashtra. He was a leader of Shiv Sangram.

Career
Vinayak Mete was the president of Shiv Sangram. Vinayak Mete was elected to the Maharashtra Legislative Council unopposed from BJP quota on 3 June 2016. He was also a member of the Nationalist Congress Party until 2014. 

He was candidate from the Bharatiya Janata Party in the 2014 Maharashtra Legislative Assembly election from the Beed Assembly constituency but lost to Jaydutt Kshirsagar of the Nationalist Congress Party.

Personal life and death
Vinayak Tukaram Mete was born on 30 June 1970 in Beed. He was married to Jyoti Mete. 

Mete died from the injuries sustained in a car accident near Madap tunnel of Mumbai–Pune Expressway on 14 August 2022, at the age of 52. He was declared dead upon arrival at the MGM Kamothe Hospital in Kamothe.

References

1970 births
2022 deaths
Nationalist Congress Party politicians from Maharashtra
Bharatiya Janata Party politicians from Maharashtra
People from Beed
Members of the Maharashtra Legislative Council
Road incident deaths in India